The René-Lévesque generating station, formerly known as Manic-3, is a hydroelectric power station located 75 km from Baie-Comeau built on Manicouagan River between 1970 and 1976. On June 22, 2010, the dam and the generating station were renamed to honour former Quebec premier René Lévesque, who was minister of Hydraulic resources during the construction of the complex and became premier of Quebec in 1976.

Description
René-Lévesque is a two dam complex. The east dam is a gravity "hollow type" made of concrete with a spillway, the dam is 71 m high and 378 m long. The west dam is a sand and rockfill type with clay inside, long of 395 m and 107 m with base width of 732 m. The Manic-3 reservoir is 70 km long and 202 m higher than sea level. The complex has six Francis turbines installed in an underground power station for a total capacity of 1,244 megawatts (later upgraded to 1326 MW).

See also 

 List of largest power stations in Canada
 Jean-Lesage generating station
 Daniel-Johnson Dam
 Manicouagan Reservoir

References

External links
Pictures and informations from Hydro-Quebec

Levesque, Rene generating station
Dams in Quebec
René Lévesque
Dams completed in 1976
Energy infrastructure completed in 1976
Dams on the Manicouagan River
Publicly owned dams in Canada